Glenea nobilis is a species of beetle in the family Cerambycidae. It was described by Bernhard Schwarzer in 1931. It is known from Java and Borneo.

References

nobilis
Beetles described in 1931